İnanç is a Turkish name and may refer to:

 İnanç Koç, Turkish basketball player
 Çetin İnanç, Turkish film director
 Efe İnanç, Turkish footballer

Turkish-language surnames
Turkish masculine given names